Mary Alessi is a Christian songwriter and Worship leader.

Early years
The daughter of evangelists, Mary and her twin sister Martha Munizzi were born in Lakeland, Florida but grew up traveling across the United States and ministering through music with her family. Mary, Martha, and their older sister Marvelyne were born with their parents' talent for music and became a part of the traveling family group as kids. The family settled in Orlando, Florida when Mary and Martha were 12, so that the children could attend formal, public school.

At age 16, Mary, Martha and Marveline, age 18, helped form a praise and worship band at the urging of a church friend. That group evolved into Testament and became popular enough to travel around the state of Florida performing in churches and at conferences and other events.

Musical career
Today, both Mary and her twin sister, Martha Munizzi, are recording artists and Mary performs a song she wrote with her sister on Martha's 2006 album No Limits Live and on the No Limits Live DVD.
 
Mary has recorded four independent albums. Her second album, More, is a live recording featuring several songs she wrote herself. Her latest is "Pressing On"

Discography

Appearance in other projects

Personal life

Mary has served as a full-time minister since 1987 when she was designated as a music director and Worship Leader. She is ordained as a minister by the Full Gospel Fellowship in Dallas, Texas.

Mary and Steve Alessi were married in 1987 and have four children Christopher, Stephanie, Lauren, and Gabrielle.

See also
Worship music
List of Christian worship music artists

External links
Metro Life Church-Miami

References

Living people
American gospel singers
Urban contemporary gospel musicians
American women songwriters
Singers from Orlando, Florida
Musicians from Lakeland, Florida
Gospel music composers
1968 births
20th-century American singers
Songwriters from Florida
20th-century American women singers
21st-century American women singers
21st-century American singers